The Blue Mouse is a 1913 German silent comedy film directed by Max Mack and starring Madge Lessing, Otto Treptow and Heinrich Peer. It was a major commercial success in Germany, and was also distributed in the United States.

The film's sets were designed by Hermann Warm.

Cast
Madge Lessing as Fritzi Lustig
Otto Treptow as Cäsar Meier
Heinrich Peer as Director Bock
Else Wannovius as Clara Brummer
Herbert Paulmüller
Willy Lengling
Martha Hoffmann
Willi Schaeffers

References

External links

Films of the German Empire
German silent feature films
Films directed by Max Mack
German films based on plays
German black-and-white films
German comedy films
1913 comedy films
Silent comedy films
1910s German films
1910s German-language films